The Statuette of Geryon is a 6th century BC bronze sculpture, showing the three-headed giant Geryon dressed as an ancient Greek hoplite. It was probably discovered in Chiusi in Italy, one of the towns of the Etruscan dodecapolis. It was one of the objects and artworks left to the musée des beaux-arts de Lyon by Jacques-Amédée Lambert in 1850.

Sources
Stéphanie Boucher « la collection étrusque du musée des beaux-arts de Lyon », Bulletin des musées et monuments lyonnais, 1964-3, vol. III, p. 68/206

6th-century BC sculptures
Antiquities of the Museum of Fine Arts of Lyon
Bronze sculptures
Etruscan sculptures
Chiusi